The Na Tcha Temple, built in 1888, is a Chinese folk religion temple in Santo António, Macau, China. It is dedicated to the worship of the popular Deity Na Tcha or Sam Tai Tsz.

History 
The Na Tcha Temple was built in homage to the guardian deity. It is believed that it was built to put an end to the plague ravaging the region during that time.

In 2004, the temple became one of the designated sites of the Historic Centre of Macau enlisted on the UNESCO World Heritage Site.

Description 
The building is painted gray, with few ornamentations, except for paintings on walls under the entrance porch. The temple's roof, rising five meters, is a traditional gable roof. True to traditional Chinese architecture, the Na Tcha has protective ceramic animal figurines on its ridge.

Location 
The temple is behind the Ruins of St. Paul's, remains of a principal Jesuit cathedral in the region, serving as one of the best examples of Macau's multicultural identity.

See also 

 A-Ma Temple, built in 1488
 Kun Iam Temple, built in 1627
 Tam Kung Temple (Macau), built in 1862
 Sam Kai Vui Kun
 Sam Tai Tsz Temple and Pak Tai Temple, Hong Kong
 List of oldest buildings and structures in Macau

References

Folk religious temples in China
Religious buildings and structures completed in 1888
Historic Centre of Macau
Macau Peninsula
Taoist temples in Macau
1888 establishments in Macau